Penfield is an outdoor clothing brand and private company that was established in Hudson, Massachusetts. Founded in 1975 by Harvey Gross, a New England native, the company has built a reputation for making down-filled jackets, fleece and outerwear.

History 

Since Penfield's inception in 1975, the brand quickly became a staple for many Americans in the 1980s. Penfield have extended their business beyond outdoor channels and into a broad range of retail channels, including retailers such as Barneys, Saks and a number of independent stores around the world.

The brand has a long history of special collaborations and private label development. The Cape Heights factory that used to produce Penfield products has produced down-filled garments for LL Bean, EMS, Lands End and Cabelas.

References

External links 
 Official  Penfield website

Outdoor clothing brands
Clothing brands of the United States
Manufacturing companies based in Massachusetts
American companies established in 1975
Clothing companies established in 1975
1975 establishments in Massachusetts